Denis (died after 1285) was a Hungarian prelate in the 13th century, who served as Bishop of Győr from 1270 to 1285.

Biography
Denis was called "frater" ("friar") in a document from 1270, thus he belonged to one of the religious orders (possibly Benedictines or Cistercians). He was made Bishop of Győr in 1270, not long before the death of Béla IV of Hungary, but it is possible that he already held the office from the previous year. He was a confidant of Stephen V of Hungary, who confirmed and transcribed several donations to the Diocese of Győr during his short reign. In 1271, Stephen V also granted the "right of Fehérvár" to Győr, i.e. promoted to the status of free royal town. Upon Denis' request, the monarch extended the right to the subjects of the landholdings of the cathedral chapter (today called Káptalan-Győr).

After the death of Stephen V, the Kingdom of Hungary fell into anarchy, when many baronial groups fought for the supreme power during the nominal rule of the minor Ladislaus IV of Hungary. Under such circumstances, the Diocese of Győr was constantly threatened by the Austrian troops of Ottokar II of Bohemia. Taking advantage of chaotic situation in Hungary, Ottokar's army invaded the borderlands of Hungary in April 1273. The influential prelate, Job Záh arrived to the region with his army and expelled his fellow bishop Denis from the castle of Győr and made himself the captain of the fortress. The Austrians, however, besieged and took the fort. Bishop Job tried to offer resistance in a tower but his enemies set fire on it, thus he was obliged to surrender. Bishop Job was taken in chains into Austria. Ottokar's troops stormed and pillaged the lands of the Diocese of Győr thereafter. When the Hungarian royal army recovered the castle, Denis returned to the town. Thereafter Denis frequently resided in the royal court beside Ladislaus IV and his faction. Following the siege, Denis negotiated with Ottokar over a conclusion of peace. During the 1270s skirmishes, the Győr Cathedral is severely damaged, according to Ladislaus' charter from 1284.

Denis attended the Synod of Buda in September 1279, convened by the papal legate Philip III, Bishop of Fermo. Denis served as bishop at least until 1285, when he was last mentioned by contemporary records. His immediate successor, Andrew first appeared in this capacity only in 1290 or 1291.

References

Sources

 
 
 

13th-century Hungarian people
13th-century Roman Catholic bishops in Hungary
Bishops of Győr